Tuba Skinny is a traditional jazz street band based in New Orleans, Louisiana. The band's instrumentation includes cornet, clarinet, trombone, tuba, tenor banjo, guitar, frottoir, and vocals. The ensemble draws its inspiration from the early jazz, ragtime, and blues music of the 1920s and 1930s. The group began as an itinerant busking band and has performed around the world, including at music festivals in Mexico, Sweden, Australia, Italy, France, Switzerland, and Spain.

For over a decade, Tuba Skinny "has grown steadily in popularity, releasing [ten] albums, frequently touring, and attracting high-profile fans from R. Crumb to Amanda Palmer and Neil Gaiman. They've garnered fans from all over the world—young and old, neophytes and niche-enthusiasts." Their albums have garnered multiple awards, and they have been hailed by Offbeat magazine, The Syncopated Times, and other publications as one of the best traditional early jazz bands performing today.

The band is popular on YouTube with "more than 500 videos, many with 100,000-plus views, in a variety of languages." However, the ensemble does not have an official YouTube page, and nearly all of the recorded footage is fan-made. The band's fan base has been described as possessing a "lighthearted, fun, flapper vibe," a reflection of the Jazz Age time period evoked by their music. Despite the band's global fame and frequent performances in nightclubs and at jazz festivals, they have continued to perform on the streets of New Orleans and other cities in order to maintain their intimate connection with audiences.

History

Beginnings in street bands

The nucleus of Tuba Skinny began coalescing in the Crescent City circa 2003 to 2005, just prior to Hurricane Katrina. Several of its musicians played together in a handful of other bands on the streets of New Orleans. None of them are native to the city. The band's orchestrator and cornetist Shaye Cohn—the granddaughter of jazz saxophonist Al Cohn—is a Bostonian. Trombonist Barnabus Jones is a Virginian. Todd Burdick, the eponymous tuba of Tuba Skinny who also plays the banjo and guitar, is a Chicagoan. Guitarist Max Bien-Kahn is from Oregon. Vocalist and bass drummer Erika Lewis is from New York's Hudson River Valley and resides in Tennessee. Clarinetist Craig Flory and frottoirist Robin Rapuzzi are from Seattle.

Dead Man Street Orchestra

In 2005, Shaye Cohn, Barnabus Jones, Todd Burdick, Kiowa Wells, and other itinerant street musicians who would eventually comprise Tuba Skinny formed a busking string band called the Dead Man Street Orchestra and often played in the hurricane-ravaged city. Subsisting in modest circumstances, they "played for tips in Jackson Square out of necessity more than choice." Cohn played the accordion, Jones played the fiddle, Burdick played the banjo, and Wells played the guitar. Alynda Segarra—future band leader of Hurray for the Riff Raff—played the mini-washboard. Their tramp band played Cajun folk music, gypsy music, and Balkan melodies, as well as "old-time mountain music in the fashion of Old Crow Medicine Show, the Avett Brothers, and Uncle Earl." A surviving 2005 recording of their Balkan melody interpretation of "You Are My Sunshine" illustrates the band's inchoate style during this period.

At least one of the band members was arrested for "bumming for money on Bourbon Street" in the heart of the French Quarter and had learned to play a musical instrument in order to no longer have to beg for spare change. As itinerant musicians, they frequently undertook boxcar tours as far away as the East Coast and West Coast. At the time, the Dead Man Street Orchestra was described by The New Yorker as a motley collection of New Orleans street people belonging to "a subculture of rail-riding, outdoor-living hobos." They were known to "sleep out in the open, look for food in trash cans, indulge themselves with excessive drinking and drugs and play great music." A gritty photo-essay chronicling the hardscrabble perambulatory band, The Ballad of the Hobo by photographer James Heil, was published in Time magazine in 2006.

While playing as the Dead Man Street Orchestra, the seeds for a brass band began to germinate in their minds. "We had this talk one day when we were with Dead Man Street Orchestra," recalled Barnabus Jones, "I remember Shaye said, 'Wouldn't it be great if one day we had a brass band?'" When the Dead Man Street Orchestra informally dissolved, Cohn, Jones, Burdick, Wells, Segarra, and other instrumentalists joined the Loose Marbles led by trumpeter Ben Polcer and clarinetist Michael Magro.

Loose Marbles
By performing with the Loose Marbles, the budding musicians who would later comprise Tuba Skinny learned to play traditional jazz. Polcer's and Magro's Loose Marbles was "a sort of amalgamated jazz corporation that creates subsidiaries around the city, to maximize tips and minimize boredom. The fifteen musicians play clarinet, trumpet, banjo, washboard, accordion, trombone, guitars, tuba, standup bass, and guitars, but you're likely to see only seven or eight performers at any given gig." The ever-changing impromptu line-up sometimes included jazz vocalist Tamar Korn and trumpeter Marla Dixon.

Cohn initially played jazz piano with the Loose Marbles. This reflected her training as a classical pianist. However, she had "burned out on classical piano" due to spending "many, many hours practicing in a tiny rehearsal room going over the same four measures again and again." One day in New Orleans, while residing in a dilapidated building where there was an assortment of "abandoned" instruments, Cohn salvaged a flood-damaged trumpet and became a devotee of the instrument. "Barnabus [Jones] and I were trying to figure out scales on the trumpet together, and it was just so fun. I just got really hooked. I had never played a wind instrument before and it just felt really powerful, so I got to play second trumpet with [the Loose Marbles], sometimes they'd invite me to play with them."

Todd Burdick likewise began his musical background on different instruments. He had played punk rock and experimental music as a percussionist, but he was introduced to the banjo, guitar, and other instruments by busking with the ensemble: "It was like learning from the ground up with them." Over time, as various musicians rolled in and out of the Loose Marbles, new ensembles were born such as chanteuse Meschiya Lake's Little Big Horns Jazz Band and, later, Tuba Skinny.

Formation and early years

 Shaye Cohn, Barnabus Jones, Kiowa Wells, and Todd Burdick had been frequently playing jazz on Royal Street in the French Quarter of New Orleans while learning an array of various instruments. They selected hot jazz because—in their estimation—it was the most accessible form of music. "People bump into you and say, ‘What kind of music is that? I never heard that kind of jazz,'" Cohn explained, "which I can relate to because, at one point, I had never heard this kind of jazz either." Since "Bourbon Street's loud bars and drunken crowds make busking, or street performances, all but impossible," Tuba Skinny often performed on Royal Street with its quieter "art galleries, antique and jewelry shops and restaurants."

The band's name, Tuba Skinny, was purportedly acquired by happenstance and was a sarcastic remark by a passerby. Whenever the band's slender sousaphone player, Todd Burdick, would cycle down a street with his iconic instrument in Faubourg Marigny, a random heckler would repeatedly shout: "Hey, look, it's Tuba Skinny!" This remark was a reference to Jackson Square musician Anthony "Tuba Fats" Lacen, a "folk hero" who fought for the rights of street musicians and who died in 2004. Burdick recounted this incident to his friends and band mates. The band decided to run with the incident and christened themselves, "Tuba Skinny." Other than the happenstance name, the band has neither official ties to Tuba Fats nor was named in his honor.

In their early years, the band drew extensively upon the Loose Marbles' repertoire. As time passed, they began resurrecting forgotten tunes by "Louis Armstrong's Hot 5 and Hot 7, Jelly Roll Morton's Red Hot Peppers, Bunk Johnson, George Lewis, Jim Robinson, the Mississippi Sheiks, Sam Morgan's Jazz Band, Johnny and Baby Dodds, Blind Blake, Blind Boy Fuller, the Memphis Jug Band, King Oliver, Bessie Smith" and others. They became a popular ensemble among local traditional jazz haunts because of their historical fidelity to the traditional 1920s jazz, which is an era that is often overlooked in the New Orleans music scene. Unlike revival or pre-revival bands, Tuba Skinny attempts to imitate the sound of traditional jazz in the days "before phonographs were widely available."

Global tours and albums 

Tuba Skinny began globally touring as a band in July 2009 when they flew to France. An acquaintance had invited the band to the coastal town of Meschers-sur-Gironde where they played music in the streets and at a local tavern. They purchased used bicycles in Meschers and embarked upon a bicycle tour visiting the picturesque seaside towns along the southwest coast of France. They camped overnight to reduce expenses.

Over the years, the band has continued their celebrated busking tradition. They played as a busking band in Hobart, Tasmania—where they recorded their fifth album Pyramid Strut in 2013—and in old town centers throughout mainland Europe such as France, Italy, and Spain. Reportedly, their least pleasant experience while busking occurred at a flea market in San Severo, Italy, where not a single person lingered to listen to them. The band also toured in their native homeland of the United States. To do so, they squeezed their eight members, primary instruments, secondary instruments, and several pets—including Barnabus' pet dog Tupelo—into a six-seat van.

Over the years, Tuba Skinny has released ten albums containing more than a hundred tracks. In September 2016, Cohn and Lewis released a country album Waiting For Stars for their other lesser-known band, The Lonesome Doves. The album, described as "original country from Chattanooga by way of New Orleans," consisted entirely of songs composed by Lewis. On the album, both Cohn and Lewis sang vocals, with Lewis playing the guitar and Cohn playing the fiddle.

During Summer 2018, the band was invited to the Netherlands where they performed five nights a week for several months with the Ashton Brothers circus. Their performances included Lewis' vocals accompanying trapeze acts and Cohn playing ragtime solos. When not performing with the circus, the band members bicycled into Utrecht where they busked on the city streets. The circus invited them back the following year, but the band declined due to their commitment to seeking out new experiences. "We're jazz musicians and seek improvisation all the time," frottoirist Rapuzzi explained, "We can't fix ourselves to the same set list of songs let alone the same acts and show routine for another season, all very untrue to the nature of our band."

In April 2019, the peripatetic band released their tenth album Some Kind-a-Shake which was recorded at The Living Room Studio in New Orleans and featured nine instrumentalists. In addition to traditional jazz and blues songs, the album featured two original compositions, "Some Kind-a-Shake" by Cohn, and "Berlin Rag" by noted clarinetist Ewan Bleach. The jazz-centric publication The Syncopated Times reviewed the album and declared that the band's "tenth album, as unbelievable as this will sound, is their best." The publication further observed that Tuba Skinny's "method is to rehearse on the street, fine tune in performance, and nail it in the studio." Particular praise was given to the album's throwback emphasis on an ensemble sound as opposed to solos.

Repertoire

Tuba Skinny's repertoire, while it includes some original material they have composed, is drawn from the lesser-known compositions of the early jazz era and has been documented to include over 400 songs. Their selection of deserving tunes has garnered praise and the following is especially noteworthy: "New Orleans Bump," "Cushion Foot Stomp," "You Can Have My Husband," "Jackson Stomp," "Deep Henderson," "Banjoreno," "Treasures Untold," "Russian Rag," "Oriental Strut," "Minor Drag," "Michigander Blues," "In Harlem's Araby," "Me and My Chauffeur," "A Jazz Battle," "Droppin' Shucks," "Fourth Street Mess Around," and "Carpet Alley Breakdown."
The singers and composers whose material they favor include Victoria Spivey, Jelly Roll Morton, Lucille Bogan, Memphis Minnie, Jabbo Smith, Georgia White, Skip James, Merline Johnson, Ma Rainey, Hattie Hart, Blind Blake and Clara Smith. Some of the bands whose material Tuba Skinny has interpreted in its own manner are the Memphis Jug Band, the Dixieland Jug Blowers and the Mississippi Mud Steppers.

While hailed as outstanding performers of traditional jazz, Tuba Skinny have not restricted their selection of material exclusively to what is permitted in the traditional repertoire. In fact, their goal is not to be circumscribed by rigid genres. The ensemble began playing predominantly early jazz and, as time passed, they transitioned "towards jug band music, country blues, string band music and ragtime." They briefly incorporated folk-country songs and New Orleans rhythm and blues into their performances before returning to their early jazz roots.

Musical style
Their music has been praised by music critics for its originality and technical competence. One review of their 2014 performance at the Melbourne Music Festival captured the quality of their music well:

Band members
Although the band's members have varied somewhat since their début in 2009, the ensemble as of 2018 includes the following musicians.

 Shaye Cohn: 
 Barnabus Jones: 
 Todd Burdick: 
 Craig Flory: 
 Gregory Sherman: 
 Max Bien-Kahn: 
 Jason Lawrence: 
 Robin Rapuzzi: 
 Erika Lewis: 

Part-time members include:
 Jonathan Doyle: 
 Ewan Bleach:

Discography

 Tuba Skinny (2009)
 Six Feet Down (2010)
 Garbage Man (2011)
 Rag Band (2012)
 Pyramid Strut (2014)
 Owl Call Blues (2014)
 Blue Chime Stomp (2016)
 Tupelo Pine (2017)
 Nigel's Dream (2018)
 Some Kind-a-Shake (2019)
 Quarantine Album: Unreleased B-Sides (2020)
 Mardi Gras EP (2021)
 Magnolia Stroll (2022)

Tuba Skinny also appears on:
 Miss Fisher's Murder Mysteries: Music From the Second Series (2013)

References

Notes

Citations

Sources

External links

 
 Tuba Skinny at Bandcamp

Dixieland ensembles
American jazz ensembles from New Orleans
Swing ensembles
Musical groups established in 2009
Musical groups from New Orleans
Jazz musicians from New Orleans